USS Wisconsin may refer to:

  was an 
  is an 
  a planned

See also
 , a shipwrecked package freighter in Lake Michigan

United States Navy ship names